Raheem Devon Gibson, often referred to as “Rah Nyse” or “Nyse” is an American record producer, songwriter and lyricist. Gibson was born on February 13, 1972, in the Throggs Neck neighborhood of the Bronx N.Y. Some of his most notable productions are “Dot Vs. TMR” for three time Grammy Nominee and NARAS award winner D-Dot/The Madd Rapper, “Let Me Find Out” for Grammy Award winning American Hip Hop trio Naughty By Nature, which appeared on the group's sixth studio album IIcons, and “I Want the World to See”, for Bad Boy recording artist G-Dep’s chart topping debut album Child of the Ghetto.

In the Spring of 2000, Rah-Nyse signed a four year contract under the company ‘Hot Bloc Productions’ with music mogul Sean Diddy Combs to join his elite team of Bad Boy Records music producers “The Hitmen”, which was managed by Diddy. The group included producers Chucky Thompson, Deric "D-Dot" Angelettie, Steven "Stevie J" Jordan, Mario Winans and Nashiem Myrick. As a ‘Bad Boy’, Nyse’s musical contributions were remixed and used on numerous Hip hop and RnB projects, including RnB artist Amerie’s 2005 single “Man up”, which was featured on ‘Wendy Williams Brings the Heat, Vol. 1’ compilation.

In 2013 Nah Nyse founded and formed the production company ‘N.Y.S.E. (Now You Seen Everything) Music’, where he produces Hip hop, RnB, and EDM (Electronic dance music) for signed and Independent acts.

Biography
Nyse began his career as a disc jockey in the late 1980s performing turntablism where he played continuous music mixes at live shows in the parks of The Bronx where he grew up. He was inspired by the unique styles and skills of iconic mixmasters DJ Scratch, DJ Jazzy Jay and DJ Jazzy Jeff. While spinning records in his hometown, Rah-Nyse decided to take his career to the next level, and in 1993 he became a co-founding member of the rap duo ‘Out of Order’ with then business partner DJ Storm.
The following year, ‘Out of Order’ was signed to independent Hip hop record label Freeze Records (formerly known as Sleeping Bag Records which featured major Hip Hop acts including EPMD). The group landed an influential endorsement from ‘Shake Whatcha Mama Gave Ya’ rapper Rock Logic from Stik-E and the Hoodz. In 1994, Nyse and his bandmate began opening for Stik-E and the Hoodz and that same year released its first self-produced single “DreamState".
In 1996, Nyse and his then business partner left Freeze Records to focus on music production. He co-founded ‘Hot Bloc Productions’ and worked on independent projects for other groups, including The Autumn People from Durban Poison Records (owned by DreamWorks Records), and ‘Totally Basic’ from Atlantic Records.

In early 2000, ‘Hot Bloc Productions’ gained popularity with the blockbuster hit first single “Dot Vs. TMR” from the album entitled Tell 'Em Why U Madd produced for All About The Benjamins artist/producer D-Dot a.k.a. The Madd Rapper, which also featured the song “You’re All Alone” produced by Kanye West. That same year, Hot Bloc was signed to a four-year production deal with Bad Boy Records under the management of music mogul Sean Diddy Combs.
Under Diddy’s management, Hot Bloc worked as part of the elite music production team known as “The Hitmen,” which included other prominent producers such as Kanye West, Deric "D-Dot" Angelettie, Steven "Stevie J" Jordan, Mario Winans, Easy Mo Bee, Chucky Thompson, and Nashiem Myrick. At Bad Boy, Nyse worked with major acts such as Naughty by Nature, G. Dep and Harve Pierre a.k.a. Joe Hooker.

While with Bad Boy, he produced music for various Hip hop, RnB and Alternative artists out of his music lab, Hot Bloc Studios in the Bronx, N.Y. Many artists recorded and utilized the team for production, including French Montana,  Lord Tariq and Peter Gunz, Hell Rell, Ice Shuler, D.F.L. and others. In 2003, rapper Ice Shuler filmed the video for his first single “Serious” at Hot Bloc Studios, for the independent Hip hop label ‘Board of Directors, Inc.’. The single featured appearances by Remy Ma and DJ Kay Slay a.k.a.The Drama King. Rah Nyse decided to embark on a new musical venture and relocated to Atlanta in 2008 to pursue opportunities as a solo producer. The following year, he was hired by Indie label ‘Southern World Records’ to produce music for contemporary RnB artist Eddie J. By 2009, Nyse produced “I Can’t Stop Waiting” for his album “Feels Like Rain” and performed on his 2010 single “Never Let You Go”.
In a 2015 interview with Icon Studios in Atlanta Georgia, Nyse said he strives to be the “Hitmaker of the Future”. He was commissioned by former American Idol contestant Nica Nashae to produce her first solo project and has established major relationships in the music licensing industry.

Record Labels
Rah Nyse was signed to Freeze Records as the group ‘Out of Order’ in 1994. The group went on to form production team ‘Hot Bloc Productions’ and was signed to Diddy’s Bad Boy Records as a ‘Hitmen’ producer from 2000-2004. As a producer, he worked with several major labels including Atlantic Records, TVT Records, Sony Music Entertainment, Columbia and others.

Discography
HOT BLOC PRODUCTIONS DISCOGRAPHY

References

External links
 Rah-Nyse Official Website

1972 births
Living people
African-American songwriters
Songwriters from New York (state)
People from Throggs Neck, Bronx
Record producers from New York (state)
21st-century African-American people
20th-century African-American people